Jean Bolinder (5 December 1935 – 7 June 2020) was a Swedish author and film director. 

Linköping-born Bolinder debuted in 1967 with the crime novel Skulle jag sörja då... in which he introduces the character Jöran and Marianne Bundin as problem solvers. The fictional couple later appeared in several of Bolinder's books. 

Bolinder was born in Linköping but grew up in Enköping. He studied in Motala, whose history he frequently discussed in his novels. Bolinder studied at Uppsala University, graduating in 1964, and Lund University, graduating in 1971.

Bolinder also directed the films "Hjernans storhet och fall",  "flykt", and "Ur askan i Elden".

He died on 7 June 2020.

Bibliography

References

2020 deaths
20th-century Swedish novelists
1935 births
People from Enköping
Uppsala University alumni
Lund University alumni
21st-century Swedish novelists
20th-century Swedish male writers
21st-century male writers
Swedish film directors